José Antonio "Toño" Rodríguez Romero (born 4 July 1992), is a Mexican professional footballer who plays as a goalkeeper for Liga MX club Tijuana, on loan from Guadalajara. He is an Olympic gold medalist.

Club career
Rodríguez started his career for Liga MX club Guadalajara, and made his debut on 6 April 2013 against Jaguares. In 2011, he was loaned to Veracruz for two seasons, and was the starting goalkeeper for the team. He returned to Guadalajara after two successful seasons with Veracruz, and became the starting goalkeeper of Guadalajara in 2014 after Luis Ernesto Michel was loaned to Saprissa of Costa Rica.

On 26 November 2019, Rodríguez scored a goal from inside his own box during Guadalajara's 3–1 win against Veracruz.

International career
Rodríguez has represented Mexico in the U-17, U-20, and U-23 divisions. He was among the squad that won the gold medal at the 2012 London Summer Olympics.

Honours
Guadalajara
Copa MX: Apertura 2015
Supercopa MX: 2016
CONCACAF Champions League: 2018

Mexico Youth
CONCACAF U-20 Championship: 2011
Pan American Games: 2011
CONCACAF Olympic Qualifying Championship: 2012
Toulon Tournament: 2012
Olympic Gold Medal: 2012

References

External links
 
 
 
 
 
 

1992 births
Living people
C.D. Guadalajara footballers
Footballers at the 2012 Summer Olympics
Liga MX players
Medalists at the 2012 Summer Olympics
Mexico youth international footballers
Mexico under-20 international footballers
Olympic footballers of Mexico
Olympic gold medalists for Mexico
Olympic medalists in football
Footballers from Guadalajara, Jalisco
C.D. Veracruz footballers
Lobos BUAP footballers
Association football goalkeepers
Pan American Games gold medalists for Mexico
Pan American Games medalists in football
Mexican footballers
Footballers at the 2011 Pan American Games
Medalists at the 2011 Pan American Games